The twenty-sixth series of the British television drama series Grange Hill began broadcasting on 28 January 2003, before ending on 3 April 2003 on BBC One. The series follows the lives of the staff and pupils of the eponymous school, an inner-city London comprehensive school. It consists of twenty episodes.

Cast

Pupils

Teachers

Others

Episodes

Production and casting
Series 26 is the first series to be filmed at Childwall Studios in Liverpool, Merseyside, and produced by the show creator's, Phil Redmond, production company, Mersey Television. Liverpool City Council's film office helped to find locations for exterior filming, including Norris Green housing estate and three schools: Croxteth Comprehensive School, Holly Lodge Girls' College and Ashfield School.

Returning cast members included: Stuart Organ (Peter Robson), John Joseph (Ian Hudson), Amanda Fahy (Shannon Parks), Jessica Staveley-Taylor (Leah Stewart), Colin White (Spencer Hargreaves), Arnold Oceng (Calvin Braithwaite), Jalpa Patel (Anika Modi), Lindsey Ray (Amy Davenport), Matthew Buckley (Martin Miller), Sammy O'Grady (Kathy McIlroy), Kacey Barnfield (Maddie Gilks) and Shane Leonidas (Josh Irving). The new cast members were from the North of England. Todd Carty made a guest appearance in the first episode and Chris Perry-Metcalf was cast as Tucker's nephew, Patrick "Togger" Johnson. Perry-Metcalf had two auditions and secured the role two days before filming. Perry-Metcalf described Togger as a "bit of a rebel" who believes "he doesn't have to work and that school's just for messing around and getting people into trouble." He added that working with Carty was "amazing." Following Staveley-Taylor's departure in episode 10, Tom Graham and Sarah Lawrence joined as Nick Edwards and Mel Edwards. Holly Quin-Ankrah and Kirsten Cassidy joined the series as step-sisters Karen and Tanya Young. Quin Ankrah received no acting role prior to gaining the part of Karen at the age of 14. Describing her character as "evil", Cassidy said her role is a "good part to play."

DVD release
The twenty-sixth series of Grange Hill has never been released on DVD as of 2014.

Notes

References

2003 British television seasons
Grange Hill